Bethany Baptist Church is a Baptist church located at 303 West 153rd Street in Manhattan, New York City. The church building was originally built for as the Washington Heights Evangelical Lutheran Church, built 1921 to designs by architect Francik Averkamp of 600 West 181st Street. A minor brick and stone fence was built in 1911 to designs by Upjohn & Conable, indicating an earlier building.

Bethany Bapstist was founded by the Rev. John Joseph on February 12, 1932 at 327 West 126th Street, New York City. There is no current pastor at this time..

References 

Dunlap, David W. From Abyssinian to Zion: A Guide to Manhattan's Houses of Worship. (New York: Columbia University Press, 2004.).

External links
 Official Website

Former Lutheran churches in the United States
Baptist churches in New York City
Washington Heights, Manhattan
Churches in Manhattan
Churches completed in 1921
Gothic Revival church buildings in New York City